The 535th Bombardment Squadron is an inactive United States Air Force unit. During World War II, the squadron engaged in combat in the European Theater of Operations, earning two Distinguished Unit Citations.  It returned to the United States and was inactivated at Sioux Falls Army Air Field, South Dakota after V-E Day, but was active in the reserve from 1947 to 1949, although it is not clear whether it was fully equipped or manned.

History

World War II

Training in the United States
The squadron was first activated on 3 November 1942 at Gowen Field, Idaho as one of the four original squadrons of the 381st Bombardment Group. It gathered its initial cadre at Gowen, but only began training for combat with the Boeing B-17 Flying Fortress after moving to Pyote Army Air Field, Texas at the end of the year. The air echelon marshalled at Salinas Army Air Field, Kansas and began movement by the North Atlantic Ferry Route on 15 May.

Combat in the European Theater
The air echelon of the squadron arrived at RAF Bovingdon in late May 1943.  The following month, the squadron was reunited at RAF Ridgewell, which was to be its combat station for the rest of the war.  The squadron entered the strategic bombing campaign against Germany, when it flew its first mission on 21 June, a diversionary attack against Antwerp.  Its targets in France included an aircraft assembly plant near Villacoublay, and an engine plant at Le Mans, locks at Saint-Nazaire, and Amiens – Glisy Aerodrome.  It also attacked an aircraft plant in Brussels, Belgium.  During Blitz Week, it bombed nitrate factories in Heroya, Norway, stopping production for over three months.

The squadron also flew deeper penetration missions into Germany.  It hit oil refineries at Gelsenkirchen,  submarine pens at Kiel, aircraft plants at Kassel and Leipzig, industrial targets in Münster, marshalling yards at Offenberg, and the ball bearing plants at Schweinfurt.  On 8 October 1943, despite heavy enemy interceptor opposition, it accurately struck shipyards at Bremen, for which it was awarded the Distinguished Unit Citation (DUC).  All squadron bombers that returned from this mission received battle damage.   It received a second DUC for attacks on aircraft plants in Germany on 11 January 1944.  In late February 1944, the unit participated in Big Week, the intensive attacks on the German aircraft industry.

The squadron was occasionally taken off strategic operations to perform air support and interdiction missions.  It bombed bridges and airfields near the beachhead to support Operation Overlord, the invasion of Normandy, in June 1944.  The following month, it attacked positions of enemy forces opposing Operation Cobra, the breakout at Saint Lo.   It supported Operation Market Garden, the airborne attacks in the Netherlands near Arnhem, in the fall.  From December 1944, through January 1945, it attacked lines of communications and airfields near the battle zone during the Battle of the Bulge.  It also supported the Allied crossing of the Rhine and push through central Germany in March 1945.

Return to the United States and inactivation
The squadron flew its last mission on 26 April 1945 and the majority of the unit's aircraft departed the theater on 24 May 1945.  Ground personnel sailed on the RMS Queen Elizabeth on 24 June, arriving in the US by the end of the month.  The squadron was located at Sioux Falls Army Air Field, South Dakota a few days later and was inactivated on 24 August 1945.

Air Force reserve
The squadron was activated in September 1947 in the reserve at Offutt Field, Nebraska, where its training was supervised by the 4131st AAF Base Unit of Air Defense Command (ADC).  It was again assigned to the 381st Group, which remained at Offutt Air Force Base when the squadron moved to at Lincoln Municipal Airport, Nebraska in February 1948.  Although designated a very heavy bombardment group, it does not appear to have been fully manned or equipped.  In 1948 Continental Air Command assumed responsibility for managing reserve and Air National Guard units from ADC.   President Truman’s reduced 1949 defense budget required reductions in the number of units in the Air Force, and the 535th was inactivated In June 1949, as reserve flying operations at Lincoln Airport ended.

Lineage
 Constituted as the 535th Bombardment Squadron (Heavy) on 28 October 1942
 Activated on 3 November 1942
 Redesignated 535th Bombardment Squadron, Heavy on 20 August 1943
 Inactivated on 28 August 1945
 Redesignated 535th Bombardment Squadron, Very Heavy on 25 August 1947
 Activated in the reserve on 15 September 1947
 Inactivated on 27 June 1949

Assignments
 381st Bombardment Group, 3 November 1942 – 28 August 1945
 381st Bombardment Group, 15 September 1947 – 27 June 1949

Stations
 Gowen Field, Idaho, 3 November 1942
 Ephrata Army Air Field, Washington, 1 December 1942
 Pyote Army Air Base, Texas, 5 January 1943
 Pueblo Army Air Base, Colorado, 6 April–8 May 1943
 RAF Ridgewell (Station 167), England, 2 June 1943 – 24 June 1945
 Sioux Falls Army Air Field, South Dakota, 3 July–28 August 1945
 Offutt Field (later Offutt Air Force Base), Nebraska, 15 Sep 1947
 Lincoln Municipal Airport, Nebraska, 12 February 1948 – 27 Jun 1949

Aircraft
 Boeing B-17 Flying Fortress, 1942-1945

Awards and campaigns

See also

 List of United States Air Force missile squadrons
 B-17 Flying Fortress units of the United States Army Air Forces

References

Notes
 Explanatory notes

 Citations

Bibliography

External links
 The 381st Bomb Group Website

Bombardment squadrons of the United States Air Force
Bombardment squadrons of the United States Army Air Forces
Military units and formations established in 1942
World War II strategic bombing units